Metsä may refer to:

 Metsä Group
 Metsä (theme park)
 Metsä (album)